The 1920 United States presidential election in Nevada took place on November 2, 1920, as part of the 1920 United States presidential election which was held throughout all contemporary 48 states. Voters chose seven representatives, or electors to the Electoral College, who voted for president and vice president. 

Nevada voted for Republican nominee, Senator Warren G. Harding of Ohio, over the Democratic nominee, Governor James M. Cox of Ohio. Harding ran with Governor Calvin Coolidge of Massachusetts, while Cox ran with Assistant Secretary of the Navy Franklin D. Roosevelt of New York. 

Harding won Nevada by a margin of 20.70%.

Results

Results by county

See also
United States presidential elections in Nevada

References

1920
Nevada
1920 Nevada elections